Severnoye Butovo District (Northern Butovo) is an administrative district (raion) of South-Western Administrative Okrug, and one of the 125 raions of Moscow, Russia. Population: 95,937 (2020 est.).

See also
Administrative divisions of Moscow

References

Notes

Sources

Districts of Moscow